The following is a list of ancient Persians.

Monarchs

Achaemenid dynasty
Achaemenes, founder of the dynasty.
Teispes of Anshan, his son.
Cyrus I of Anshan, his son.
Ariaramnes of Persia, son of Teispes and co-ruler of Cyrus I.
Cambyses I of Anshan, son of Cyrus I.
Arsames of Persia, son of Ariaramnes and co-ruler of Cambyses I
Cyrus II the Great, son of Cambyses I, ruled from c. 550 - 530 BC.
Cambyses II, his son, ruled 530 - 521 BC.
Smerdis, his alleged brother, ruled 521 BC
Darius the Great, his brother-in-law and grandson of Arsames, ruled 521 -486 BC.
Xerxes I, his son, ruled 486 - 465 BC
Artaxerxes I, his son, ruled 464 - 424 BC.
Xerxes II, his son, ruled 424 - 423 BC.
Sogdianus, his half-brother and rival, ruled 424 - 423 BC.
Darius II, his half-brother and rival, ruled 424 - 404 BC.
Artaxerxes II, his son, ruled 404 - 358 BC (see also Xenophon).
Artaxerxes III, his son, ruled 358 - 338 BC
Arses, his son, ruled 338 - 336 BC
Darius III Codomannus, great-grandson of Darius II, ruled 336 -330 BC

The epigraphic evidence for the rulers before Cyrus the Great is highly suspect, and often considered to have been invented by Darius I.

Parthian dynasty
See also Argead and Seleucid dynasty for the foreign rulers over Persia 330- 247 BC BC

Arsaces I c. 247–211 BC 
(In some histories, Arsaces's brother Tiridates I is said to have ruled c. 246–211 BC.)
Arsaces II c. 211–185 BC (frequently called Artabanus by early scholars)
Phriapatius c. 185–170 BC
Unknown king (probably the same Phraates I) c. 170–168 BC
Phraates I c. 170–167 BC
Mithridates I c. 167–132 BC
Phraates II c. 132–127 BC
Artabanus I c. 127–126 BC
Unknown king (probably Vologases (I)) c. 126–122 BC
Unknown king (probably Artabanus (II)) c. 122–121 BC
Mithridates II c. 121–91 BC
Gotarzes I c. 91–87 BC
Unknown king (probably Artabanus (III) or Sanatruces) c. 91–77 BC
Mithridates (III) c. 88–67 BC
Orodes I c. 80–75 BC
Sanatruces c. 77–70 BC
Unknown king (probably Vardanes (I)) c. 77–66 BC
Phraates III c. 70–57 BC
Unknown king c. 66–63 BC
Mithridates (IV) or Mithridates III c. 65–54 BC
Orodes II c. 57–38 BC
Pacorus I c. 39–38 BC (co-ruler with his father Orodes II)
Phraates IV c. 38–2 BC
Tiridates II c. 30–26 BC
Mithridates (V) c. 12–9 BC 
Phraates V (Phraataces) c. 2 BC–4 AD
Musa c. 2 BC–4 AD (co-ruler with her son Phraates V)
Orodes III c. 6 AD
Vonones I c. 8–12
Artabanus (IV) or Artabanus II c. 10–38
Tiridates III c. 35–36
Cinnamus c. 37
Gotarzes II c. 40–51
Vardanes I c. 40–47
Vonones II c. 45–51
Mithridates (VI) c. 49–50 
Sanabares c. 50–65 
Vologases I c. 51–78
Vardanes II c. 55–58
Vologases II c. 77–80
Pacorus II c. 78–115
Artabanus (V) or Artabanus III c. 80–90
Vologases III c. 105–147
Osroes I c. 109–129
Mithridates (VII) c. 115–116 killed in battle with Trajanus's troops
Sanatruces II c. 116 killed in battle with Parthamaspates's troops
Parthamaspates c. 116 
Mithridates (VIII) or Mithridates IV c. 129–140
Unknown king c. 140
Vologases IV c. 147–191
Osroes II c. 190 (rival claimant)
Vologases V c. 191–208
Tiridates IV c. 200
Vologases VI c. 208–228
Artabanus (VI) or Artabanus IV c. 216–224

Sassanid dynasty, 224-651
Ardashir I from 224 to 241.
Shapur I from 241 to 272
Hormizd I from 272 to 273.
Bahram I from 273 to 276.
Bahram II from 276 to 293.
Bahram III year 293.
Narseh from 293 to 302.
Hormizd II from 302 to 310.
Shapur II from 310 to 379
Ardashir II from 379 to 383.
Shapur III from 383 to 388.
Bahram IV from 388 to 399.
Yazdegerd I from 399 to 420.
Bahram V from 420 to 438.
Yazdegerd II from 438 to 457.
Hormizd III from 457 to 459.
Peroz I from 457 to 484.
Balash from 484 to 488.
Kavadh I from 488 to 531.
Djamasp from 496 to 498.
Khosrau I from 531 to 579.
Hormizd IV from 579 to 590.
Khosrau II from 590 to 628.
Bahram VI from 590 to 591.
Bistam from 591 to 592.
Hormizd V year 593.
Kavadh II year 628.
Ardashir III from 628 to 630.
Peroz II year 629.
Shahrbaraz year 630.
Boran and others from 630 to 631.
Hormizd VI (or V) from 631 to 632.
Yazdegerd III from 632 to 651.

Satraps

Achaemenid

Abrocomas
Abulites
Achaemenes (satrap)
Ada of Caria
Adusius
Ariobarzan
Artabazos I of Phrygia
Artabazos II of Phrygia
Artaphernes
Atropates
Camissares
Gobryas
Masistes
Mithridates I of Cius
Pharnabazus (5th century BC)
Pharnabazus, son of Artabazus
Phrataphernes
Satibarzanes
Spithridates
Struthas
Thyus
Tiribazus
Tissaphernes
Tithraustes

Mithridatic Dynasty of Pontus
Mithridates VI Eupator

Women
Amestris
Artystone
Atossa wife of Darius I
Damaspia
Drypetis wife of Hephaestion
Mandane of Media
Parysatis
Sisygambis
Stateira (wife of Artaxerxes II)

Religious figures
Mani
Mazdak

References

 
+
Persians